Bryan Brinkman is a cartoon animator and Crypto art creator from the United States of America.

Biography

Brinkman grew up in Omaha, Nebraska, before studying animation at the University of the Arts, Philadelphia. Currently Brinkman works in New York, New York.

Style and career 
His work, artistic style and concepts fall under the Pop Art and Animation categories and his work is often linked to digital art and NFTs. His art is produced with 3D computer graphics software and depicts colorful imagery touching on human emotions.

In 2022, he signed with Creative Artists Agency

Selected Art exhibitions and galleries 

 SuperRare Museum: CryptoPop: 2020
 ZoraTopia x For The TL: SXSW 2021
 SuperRare Monolith: Art Basel 2021
 RAREWorld: Art Basel 2021
 Unrevealed: Art Basel 2021
 ZoraTopia x For The TL @ Art Basel 2021
 Dreamverse: NFTNYC 2021
 Off The Chain: NFTNYC 2021
 Christie's NYC Post-War to Present: The NFTs 2021
 Natively Digital: A Curated NFT Sale: Sothebys, 2021
 SuperRare Gallery in SoHo, New York City, 2022
 NFTSea: NFTNYC 2022
 SCOPE: Art Basel 2022

The Bryan Brinkman Experiment

On March 11, 2009. Brinkman was chosen during a taping of Late Night with Jimmy Fallon to be followed on Twitter as a part of "The Bryan Brinkman Experiment". Guests on the show including Russell Brand, Alex Albrecht, Kevin Rose, and Questlove tweeted for their fans to follow Brinkman. At the time he had 7 followers. Within a few days he reached over 34,000.

References

External links 
 Bryan Brinkman's web site

Living people
Animators from Nebraska
Artists from Omaha, Nebraska
University of the Arts (Philadelphia) alumni
Year of birth missing (living people)